Live at the Black Sheep is the title of a live album by folk singer/guitarist Greg Brown.

Performing with Brown are Garnet Rogers, and the duo of Pete Heitzman and Karen Savoca. After all four musicians had performed at the Ottawa Folk Festival, they crossed the Ottawa River and made their way to the Black Sheep, a club in Wakefield, Quebec, for two nights of joint concerts. These recordings are taken from those sessions.

Track listing
Greg Brown performs on tracks 1, 4, 7, 10 and 12.

 "Last Fair Deal Gone Down" (Johnson)
 "Nowhere to Go" (Savoca)
 "I Still Miss Someone" (Cash, Cash Jr.) 
 "Milk of the Moon" (Brown)
 "Between Girl and Gone" (K. Savoca)
 "In the Wind" (Rogers)
 "Little Satchel" (trad.)
 "Same All Over" (Savoca)
 "Who Could Have Known" (Rogers)
 "Summer Lightning" (Rogers)
 "Bittersweet" (Savoca)
 "Beulah Land" (trad.)
 "Goodnight, Irene" (Huddie Ledbetter)

Personnel
Greg Brown – vocals, guitar
Garnet Rogers - vocals, guitar, fiddle, flute
Karen Savoca - vocals, congas, percussion
Pete Heitzman - guitar, six-string bass
Marcus Vichert - project coordination, live recording, editing (with thanks to Scott Merrit)
Steve Darke - live sound
Mix by Marcus Vichert and Pete Heitzman
Mastering by Peter Moshay at A-Pawling Studio, Pawling NY

References

Greg Brown (folk musician) live albums
2003 live albums